Coat of arms of Jerusalem may refer to:
the medieval coat of arms of the Kingdom of Jerusalem, see Jerusalem cross
the modern Emblem of Jerusalem, the official symbol of the city of Jerusalem